Mamercus is an ancient Roman name; see Mamercus (praenomen). In late antiquity it is found also as Mamertus. People named Mamercus or Mamertus include:

 Mamercus, legendary ancestor of the Roman gens with the nomen Aemilius; see Aemilia (gens)
 Mamercus Aemilius Mamercinus (fl. 5th century BC)
 Mamercus of Catane, tyrant of the Sicilian city Catane 345-338 BC
 Mamercus Aemilius Lepidus Livianus (d. c. 62 BC)
 Mamercus Aemilius Scaurus (fl. early 1st century)
 Claudianus Mamertus (d. c. 473), Gallo-Roman theologian and brother of Saint Mamertus
 Saint Mamertus (d. c. 475)

See also
 Mamurius Veturius

Ancient Roman prosopographical lists